Nabalus asper (formerly Prenanthes aspera), commonly called the rough rattlesnakeroot or rough white lettuce, is a species of plant in the family Asteraceae occurring in the eastern United States from South Dakota and Pennsylvania south to Oklahoma, Louisiana, and Alabama. This perennial plant blooms in late summer and autumn. In 2010, it was reclassified from the genus Prenanthes to Nabalus.

Historic distribution
Jason Hale collected this species sometime before 1843 in Louisiana, probably near where he lived at the time in Rapides Parish and probably in a prairie that no longer exists; his specimen is still the only known collection in Louisiana.

References

Cichorieae
Flora of the Eastern United States
Flora of the Appalachian Mountains
Taxa named by André Michaux